Augustus Friedrich Finkelnburg (May 6, 1830January 1, 1889) was a German American immigrant, lawyer, Republican politician, and pioneer of Buffalo County, Wisconsin.  He served two years in the Wisconsin State Senate and one year in the State Assembly, representing Buffalo County, and served as county judge and district attorney.

Biography

Born in Rhenish Prussia, Finkelnburg emigrated to the United States and settled in Missouri. He then moved to California. In 1855, Finkelnburg settled in Fountain City, Buffalo County, Wisconsin and practiced law. Finkelnburg served as county clerk, Wisconsin circuit court clerk for Buffalo County, and district attorney. He also served as county judge for Buffalo County. In 1874, Finkelnburg served in the Wisconsin State Assembly as a Republican. In 1882 and 1883, Finkelnburg served in the Wisconsin State Senate. He died in San Antonio, Texas, where he had gone to recover from ill health.

Electoral history

Wisconsin Assembly (1874)

| colspan="6" style="text-align:center;background-color: #e9e9e9;"| General Election, November 4, 1873

Wisconsin Senate (1880)

| colspan="6" style="text-align:center;background-color: #e9e9e9;"| General Election, November 2, 1880

References

External links
 

1830 births
1889 deaths
German emigrants to the United States
People from Fountain City, Wisconsin
Wisconsin state court judges
County clerks in Wisconsin
District attorneys in Wisconsin
Republican Party members of the Wisconsin State Assembly
Republican Party Wisconsin state senators
19th-century American politicians
19th-century American judges